Amt Ruhland is an Amt ("collective municipality") in the district of Oberspreewald-Lausitz, in Brandenburg, Germany. Its seat is in Ruhland.

The Amt Ruhland consists of the following municipalities:

 Grünewald
 Guteborn
 Hermsdorf
 Hohenbocka
 Ruhland
 Schwarzbach

Demography

References

Ruhland
Oberspreewald-Lausitz